, also known simply as Noein, is a Japanese science fiction anime television series directed by Kazuki Akane and produced by Satelight. The series has 24 episodes which make up a complete storyline. The English version was produced and dubbed by Manga Entertainment.

Summary

Fifteen years in the future, a violent pan-dimensional war is taking place between the two dominant "time-spaces" of the universe. These are La'cryma, a possible future of our own world, and Shangri-La, another possible dimension fifteen years after ours, intent on the destruction of all space and time. La'cryma's elite military force, known as the "Dragon Cavalry", is sent through space and time to find it.

In one possible present, twelve-year-old Haruka and her friend Yū Gotō are contemplating running away from home when they meet a member of the Dragon Cavalry named Karasu, who is a possible Yū from the future. La'cryma believes that Haruka is the Dragon Torque, but Karasu vows to protect her rather than sacrifice her for his home dimension. Other than the Dragon Cavalry, Haruka is targeted by the mysterious Noein, the entity behind Shangri'la who is intent on bringing her into his timespace to end all universes.

Production
Noein is set in the Japanese port city of Hakodate, Hokkaido. The animators took care to recreate the city's buildings, port, and environments.

Characters
 
 
 Haruka is the central protagonist of the anime. She is 12 years old and was born in Tokyo, but moved with her mother when she was 8 to Hakodate to live in her mother's childhood home. Haruka is a very fast runner and acts very mature for a girl her age.

 
 
 Haruka's 38 year old mother. She moved with Haruka back to her hometown of Hakodate after her divorce from Takuya.

 
 
 Haruka's 41 year old father. He is a prominent scientist in the field of quantum physics and one of the founders of the Magic Circle Project, which aims to control the flow of spacetime.

 
 
 In the present timespace, he is one of Haruka's classmates and best friends, and one of the main protagonists of the anime. Yu is 12 years old, and he, unlike other students, is being forced by his mother Miyuki to go to cram school in order to pass a provincial enrollment test and go to a Tokyo junior high.

 
 
 Yū's 38 year old mother, who is very strict about Yū's school work.

 
 
 In the present timespace, she is another of Haruka's classmates and one of her best friends. Ai is 12 years old, and is a stubborn, hot-headed and tough tomboy. She is an expert in soccer, and she has a crush on Isami that doesn't initially seem to be reciprocated.

 
 
 He is another one of Haruka's friends in the present timespace. Isami is 12 years old, and lives with his older brother Tsuyoshi, younger sister Fumiko, and grandmother, as their parents both recently died. He appears to be tough on the outside but has a fear for ghosts, and he is constantly nagging Yū about being a "mama's boy" and never doing anything but study and go to cram school.

 
 
 In the present timespace, she is a close friend and classmate of Haruka, Yū, Isami, and Ai. Miho is 12 years old, and is a very chipper bespectacled girly-girl who's obsessed with ghosts, aliens, UFOs, Ouija, and the paranormal and supernatural in general.

 
 
 She is a 27 year old quantum researcher for the Magic Circle Project.

 
 
 He is Ryōko's 39 year old partner, acting as her personal driver and bodyguard while she researches quantum phenomena.

 
 
 She is the 24 year old teacher to Haruka and her group of friends. She does not seem to get along with Ryōko, and Isami has an obvious crush on her. Miss Yukie is also prone to reckless driving. Family-wise, she mentions in episode 2 that her mother lives in the area, but she's never seen.

 
 
 He is a 35 year old scheming and corrupt corporate leader who will stop at nothing to make sure the Magic Circle Project is carried out, as he is the majority shareholder in it when Dr. Mayuzumi resigned and was paid out from it six months earlier. Shinohara is not above making threats or physical violence to make sure things go in his favor. After the timespaces separate, he was last seen on the floor in handcuffs. He was apparently arrested for attempted murder for shooting Kooriyama, and assaulting Dr. Mayuzumi.

 
 
 Miho's mother. Like her daughter, she wears glasses, and they both share the same spiritual obsessions.

 
 
 Isami's older brother. A stereotypical dumb high school jock.

 
 
 One of Haruka's best friends and classmates when she lived in Tokyo.

 
 
 Member of the Supreme Council.

 
 
 Member of the Supreme Council.

 
 
 Member of the Supreme Council.

 
 
 Karasu, the Japanese word for crow, is the 27 year old version of Yū in the future timespace of La'cryma and one of the protagonists of the anime.

 
 
 He is the 27 year old version of Isami in the same future timespace as Karasu. Fukurō is Japanese for owl.

 
 
 A 22 year old Dragon Knight of Middle Eastern descent and whose name is Japanese for finch, he resembles a tall, skinny man with bulging purple eyes, dark lips, and a long point of blond hair that hangs over his face, as well as gray/silver spirals that almost resemble the bolts on the neck of Frankenstein's Monster.

 
 
 The 25 year old second in command of the Dragon Knights, whose name is Japanese for egret, she turned her love toward Karasu to hatred due to his perceived betrayal.

 
 
 Tobi is a 21 year old Dragon Knight who mastered the technical side of the future timespace whose name is Japanese for kite. Although weak in combat, Tobi is proven to be an invaluable member of the knights. Tobi is male, although he is given a female voice and referred to as "she" in the English dub. The reason for the change of gender to female is unknown.

 
 
 He is a 28 year old Dragon Knight who accompanied Atori and Tobi in leaving La'cryma.

 
 
 He is the 32 year old leader of the Dragon Knight Squad, and was the only member to remain on La'cryma. Kuina is Japanese for rail. He had feelings for Kosagi, but his affections were not returned.

 
 Noein Masked 
 Noein Unmasked 
 Noein is another Yū from a different timespace where he survived the car crash that killed Ms. Yukie, Isami, and Ai and in which he had to endure watching a bloody Haruka be killed in the ensuing explosion. Unable to bear the pain of losing her, Noein decided to look for a new Haruka in a different timespace.

 
 Male Others 
 Female Others 
 They are the residents of Shangri'la. They all were originally residents of other space-times who desired to live in Noein's world, discarding their bodies and existing as merely a collective consciousness that reluctantly serves as an extension of Noein's will. They appear to be able to take a limited form of a metallic dragon/seahorse shape with one ribbon like arm that ends in a hand. When Noein dies, his minions leave his body to return to their own worlds.

Distribution
 SCI FI began airing Noein in the United States as part of its Ani-Monday programming block on June 18, 2007.
 In Australia, Noein was first broadcast on free-to-air-TV on ABC2 (the national digital public television channel) from 7:30pm on Tuesday 21 August 2007, and concluded on Tuesday 29 January 2008. Repeat airing began from 6:00pm on Sunday 26 August 2007, and concluded on Sunday 3 February 2008. Repeats began again, airing double episodes from 12:30pm Sunday 10 February 2008, and concluded on Sunday 11 May 2008.
 In the Philippines, TV5 started its broadcast on November 10, 2008.
 In Italy, Rai 4 started broadcasting the series free-to-air on September 30, 2012.

Home media releases
Manga Entertainment originally licensed the anime in the North America and UK/Ireland territories, while Madman Entertainment has licensed it for Australia and New Zealand. The series was released on a total of six discs. In 2008, Manga re-release the series in a complete box set. On July 25, 2015, Funimation announced their license to Noein and re-released the series on Blu-ray on January 12, 2016. Anime Limited have acquired the series for a UK release.

Music
The two original soundtracks are composed by Hikaru Nanase.
 Noein Original Soundtrack Vol.1 / LACA-5460
 Noein Original Soundtrack Vol.2 / LACA-5491

Opening Theme:
 « Idea » by Eufonius
Ending Theme:
  by Solua

References

Further reading

External links
 Official Noein website (Japanese)
 Noein at Internet Movie Database
 

2005 Japanese television series debuts
2006 Japanese television series endings
Adventure anime and manga
Anime with original screenplays
Funimation
MF Bunko J
Odex
Romance anime and manga
Satelight
Science fiction anime and manga
Japanese time travel television series
Anime series
Anime and manga about parallel universes
Television series about parallel universes
Anime and manga set in Hokkaido